The Voice Israel (Hebrew: The Voice ישראל) is the Israeli version of The Voice of Holland.  It is part of the international syndication The Voice based on the reality singing competition launched in the Netherlands, created by Dutch television producer John de Mol. The show's first two-season already ended, with the winner of the first season being the Canadian-born Kathleen Reiter, and the winner of the second season being Arab-Israeli Lina Makhoul.
One of the important premises of the show is the quality of the singing talent. Four coaches, themselves popular performing artists, train the talents in their group and occasionally perform with them. Talents are selected in blind auditions, where the coaches cannot see, but only hear the auditioner.

Overview

Coaches and finalists
 – Winning coach/contestant. Winners are in bold, eliminated contestants in small font.
 – Runner-up coach/contestant. Final contestant first listed.
 – 3rd Place coach/contestant. Final contestant first listed.
 – 4th place coach/contestant. Final contestant first listed.

Series overview
Warning: the following table presents a significant amount of different colors.

Format 
The series consists of three phases: a blind audition, a battle phase, and live performance shows. Four judges/coaches, all noteworthy recording artists, choose teams of contestants through a blind audition process. Each judge has the length of the auditioner's performance (about one minute) to decide if he or she wants that singer on his or her team; if two or more judges want the same singer (as happens frequently), the singer has the final choice of coach.
Each team of singers is mentored and developed by its respective coach. In the second stage, called the battle phase, coaches have two of their team members battle against each other directly by singing the same song together, with the coach choosing which team member to advance from each of four individual "battles" into the first live round. Within that first live round, the surviving acts from each team again compete head-to-head, with a combination of public and jury vote deciding who advances onto the next round.
In the final phase, the remaining contestants (top 8) compete against each other in live broadcasts. The television audience and the coaches have equal say 50/50 in deciding who moves on to the final 4 phase. With one team member remaining for each coach, the (final 4) contestants compete against each other in the finale with the outcome decided solely by public vote.

See also
The Voice (TV series)
Music of Israel
Television in Israel

References

External links
The Voice Israel Official website

 
Channel 2 (Israeli TV channel) original programming
2012 Israeli television series debuts
Israeli reality television series
Music competitions in Israel
Channel 13 (Israel) original programming